This is an incomplete list of Christian religious houses in Austria, including those in territory historically Austrian but now in other countries, both for men and for women, whether or not still extant. All those so far listed are Roman Catholic.


Austria

A 

Admont Abbey, Admont (Styria): Benedictine monks (and earlier also nuns)
Aggsbach Charterhouse (dissolved), Aggsbach (Lower Austria): Carthusians
Altenburg Abbey, Altenburg (Lower Austria): Benedictine monks
Altmünster, see Traunkirchen Abbey
Ardagger Priory (dissolved), Ardagger (Lower Austria): men's collegiate foundation
Arnoldstein Abbey (dissolved), Arnoldstein (Carinthia): Benedictine monks

B 
Bad Gleichenberg Friary, Bad Gleichenberg (Styria): Franciscan friars
Baumgartenberg Abbey (dissolved), Baumgartenberg (Upper Austria): Cistercian monks; now used by the Sisters of the Good Shepherd and Franciscan friars
Bertholdstein, see St. Gabriel's Priory
Bludenz (Vorarlberg):
 Capuchin friary, later Franciscan friary: Capuchin friars until 1991; after then, Franciscan friars
St Peter's Priory: Dominican nuns

D 
Dürnstein Priory (dissolved), Dürnstein in the Wachau (Lower Austria): Augustinian Canons

E 
St Michael's Friary, Eisenstadt (Burgenland): Franciscan friars
Engelszell Abbey, Engelhartszell an der Donau (Upper Austria): Trappist monks, formerly Cistercian monks<ref>[Stift Engelszell (publ.): Stift Engelszell. Peda Kunstführer, Kunstverlag Peda, Passau, </ref>
Enns Friary, Enns (Upper Austria): Franciscan friars, formerly Minorites

 F Fiecht Abbey, see St. Georgenberg-Fiecht AbbeyFranciscan friary, Frauenkirchen (Burgenland): Franciscan friars
Capuchin friary, Freistadt (Upper Austria): Capuchin friars
Friesach Priory, Friesach (Carinthia): Dominican friars

 G 

Gaming Charterhouse (dissolved), Gaming in Scheibbs (Upper Austria): Carthusians
Garsten Abbey (dissolved), Garsten (Upper Austria): Benedictine monks
Geras Abbey, Geras (Lower Austria): Premonstratensian canons
Gleink Abbey (dissolved), Gleink in Steyr (Upper Austria): Benedictine monks; later Salesian Sisters
Gloggnitz Priory (later Schloss Gloggnitz), Gloggnitz (Lower Austria): Benedictine monks
Gmunden Carmel, Gmunden (Upper Austria): Discalced Carmelites
Göss Abbey (dissolved), Göss in Leoben (Styria): Benedictine nuns
Göttweig Abbey, Furth (Lower Austria): Benedictine monks
Graz Friary, Graz (Styria): Franciscan friarsGries Abbey, see Muri-Gries AbbeyGriffen Abbey (dissolved), Griffen (Carinthia): Premonstratensian canons
Gurk Abbey (dissolved), Gurk (Carinthia): Benedictine monks and nuns
Güssing (Burgenland):
Güssing Abbey: Benedictine monks
Franciscan friary, earlier Augustinian Canons
Gut Aich Priory, Sankt Gilgen (Salzburg): Benedictine monks

 H 

Hall in Tirol (Tyrol):
Hall Abbey (dissolved): women's collegiate foundation (Damenstift)
Franciscan friary
Poor Clares (dissolved)
Hallein Priory, Hallein (Salzburg): Augustinian Canons
Hamberg College (dissolved), Schardenberg (Upper Austria): Salvatorian brothers
Heiligenkreuz Abbey, Heiligenkreuz (Lower Austria): Cistercian monks
Herzogenburg Priory, Herzogenburg (formerly at St. Georgen an der Traisen, Traismauer) (Lower Austria): Augustinian CanonsHohenfurt, see Rein Abbey I 
Capuchin friary, Imst (Tyrol): Capuchin friars
Innsbruck (Tyrol):
Carmel of St Joseph and St Teresa: Carmelite nuns
Innsbruck Friary: Franciscan friars
Redemptorist College: Redemptorist Fathers
Servite convent: Servite friars or nuns

 K 
Kahlenberg Hermitage (dissolved), Josefsdorf, Döbling (Vienna): Camaldolese hermits
Klein-Mariazell Abbey (dissolved), Kleinmariazell, Altenmarkt an der Triesting (Lower Austria): Benedictine monks
Klostermarienberg Abbey or Marienberg Abbey (dissolved), Mannersdorf an der Rabnitz (Burgenland): Cistercian monks
Klosterneuburg Priory, Klosterneuburg (Lower Austria): Augustinian Canons
Krems (Lower Austria): Piarist Fathers
Kremsmünster Abbey, Kremsmünster (Upper Austria): Benedictine monks

 L 

Lambach Abbey, Lambach (Upper Austria): Benedictine monks
Leibnitz Friary, Leibnitz (Styria): Capuchin friars
Redemptorist College, Leoben, Leoben (Styria): Redemptorist Fathers
Lienz Friary, Lienz (Tyrol): Carmelite friars until 1785, thereafter Franciscan friars
Lilienfeld Abbey, Lilienfeld (Lower Austria): Cistercian monks

 M 

Maria Enzersdorf (Lower Austria):
Franciscan friary
Poor Clares
St. Gabriel's Mission House: Missionaries of the Divine Word (monks)
Servite priory, Maria Langegg (Lower Austria): Servites; later occupied by the Englische Fräulein, and most recently by the Community of the Beatitudes Maria Plain, see SalzburgMaria Roggendorf, see (1) Marienfeld Priory and (2) St. Joseph's PrioryMariastern Abbey, Gwiggen, Hohenweiler (Vorarlberg): Cistercian nuns
Maria Waldrast near Matrei am Brenner (Tyrol): Servite friarsMarienberg Abbey, see KlostermarienbergMarienfeld Priory, Marienfeld near Hollabrunn (Lower Austria): Cistercian nuns
Marienkron Abbey, Mönchhof (Burgenland): Cistercian nuns
Mattighofen (Upper Austria): collegiate foundation, later Mattighofen Provostry
Mattsee Priory, Mattsee (Salzburg): secular canons, formerly Benedictine monks
Mauerbach Charterhouse (dissolved), Mauerbach (Lower Austria): CarthusiansMehrerau Abbey, see Wettingen-Mehrerau AbbeyMelk Abbey, Melk (Lower Austria): Benedictine monks
Michaelbeuern Abbey, Dorfbeuern (Salzburg): Benedictine monks
Millstatt Abbey (dissolved), Millstatt (Carinthia): Benedictine monks; Knights of the Order of St. George; Jesuits
Mondsee Abbey (dissolved), Mondsee (Upper Austria): Benedictine monks
Münzbach Priory, Münzbach (Upper Austria): Dominican friars

 N 
Neuberg Abbey (dissolved), Neuberg an der Mürz (Styria): Cistercian monks
Neukloster Abbey, now Neukloster Priory, Wiener Neustadt (Lower Austria): Cistercian monksNonnberg Abbey, see Salzburg O 

Ossiach Abbey (dissolved), Ossiach (Carinthia): Benedictine monks

 P 
Pernegg Abbey (dissolved), Pernegg (Lower Austria): Premonstratensian canonesses to 1584, thereafter Premonstratensian canons
Pöllau Priory (dissolved), Pöllau (Styria): Augustinian Canons
Pulgarn Abbey, Pulgarn (Upper Austria): Order of the Holy Ghost
Pupping Friary, Pupping (Upper Austria): Franciscan friars

 R 
Ranshofen Priory (dissolved),Ranshofen (Upper Austria): Augustinian Canons
Rattenberg Priory (dissolved), Rattenberg (Tyrol): Augustinian Hermits
Reichersberg Priory, Reichersberg (Upper Austria): Augustinian Canons
Rein Abbey, known 1950-90 as Rein-Hohenfurt Abbey, Rein in Eisbach (Styria): Cistercian monks
Reutte Friary, Reutte (Tyrol): Franciscan friars
Riederberg Friary (Sancta Maria in Paradyso) (dissolved), Ried am Riederberg near Sieghartskirchen (Upper Austria): Franciscan friars (Observants)

 S St. Antony's Friary in the Pinzgau, see SalzburgSt. Bernhard's Abbey (dissolved), Sankt Bernhard-Frauenhofen (Lower Austria): Cistercian nuns, later Jesuits
St. Florian Monastery, Sankt Florian (Upper Austria): Augustinian Canons
St. Gabriel's Priory, Sankt Johann bei Herberstein (Styria), previously St. Gabriel's Abbey, Schloss Bertholdstein, Pertlstein in Fehring, Styria: Benedictine nuns
St. George's Abbey on the Längsee (dissolved), Sankt Georgen am Längsee (Carinthia): Benedictine nunsSt. Georgen an der Traisen, Traismauer: see Herzogenburg AbbeySt. Georgenberg-Fiecht Abbey, Fiecht in Vomp (Tyrol): Benedictine monks
St. Joseph's Priory, Maria Roggendorf in Hollabrunn (Lower Austria): Benedictine monks
St. Koloman's Friary, Stockerau (Lower Austria): Steyler Mission Sisters, formerly Franciscans
St. Lambrecht's Abbey, Sankt Lambrecht (Styria): Benedictine monksSancta Maria in Paradyso, see RiederbergSt. Paul's Abbey in the Lavanttal, Sankt Paul im Lavanttal (Carinthia): Benedictine monksSt. Peter's Archabbey, see SalzburgSt. Peter's Priory, Bludenz (Vorarlberg):  Augustinian nuns, later Dominican Sisters
St. Pölten Abbey (dissolved), Sankt Pölten (Lower Austria): Augustinian Canons; formerly Benedictine monks
Salzburg:

Nonnberg Abbey: Benedictine nuns
St. Antony's Friary in the Pinzgau (dissolved), Hundsdorf in Bruck an der Glocknerstraße: Franciscan friars
St. Peter's Archabbey, Salzburg: Benedictine monks
Franciscan friary, Salzburg
Capuchin friary, Salzburg
Pallottine friary, Salzburg

Säusenstein Abbey (dissolved), Säusenstein (Lower Austria): Cistercian monks
Schlägl Abbey, Schlägl (Upper Austria): Premonstratensian canons
Schlierbach Abbey, Schlierbach (Upper Austria): Cistercian monks
Schönbühel Friary, Schönbühel-Aggsbach (Lower Austria): Servite friars (vacant since 1980)
Schwaz Friary, Schwaz (Tyrol): Franciscan friars
Seckau Abbey, Seckau (Styria): Benedictine monks; formerly Augustinian Canons
Seitenstetten Abbey, Seitenstetten (Lower Austria): Benedictine monks
Spital am Pyhrn Priory (dissolved), Spital am Pyhrn (Upper Austria): hospital run by a community of lay brothers; later a collegiate foundation, afterwards a priory
Stainz Priory (dissolved), Stainz (Styria): Augustinian Canons
Stams Abbey, Stams (Tyrol): Cistercian monks
Suben Priory (dissolved), Suben (Upper Austria): Augustinian Canons

 T 
Telfs Friary, Telfs (Tyrol): Franciscan friars
Thalbach Convent, Bregenz (Vorarlberg): Thalbach, since 1983 home to The Spiritual Family "The Work," was originally established in 1436 as a tertiary Franciscan women's monastery, and disbanded by Emperor Joseph II in 1782; it was acquired by Dominican women of Hirschberg-Hirschtal / Kennelbach in 1796.
Traunkirchen Abbey (dissolved), Traunkirchen (Upper Austria): Benedictine nunsTraunsee Abbey, see Traunkirchen Abbey V 

 Vienna:
 Augustinian friary with the Augustinerkirche (Austin Friars)
 Capuchin friary with the Kapuzinergruft and Kapuzinerkirche
 Schottenstift on the Freyung, Vienna: Benedictine monks
 Villach Friary at Villach (Carinthia): Franciscan friars
 Viktring Abbey (dissolved) at Viktring (Carinthia): Cistercian monks
 Volders Priory at Volders near Innsbruck (Tyrol): Servite friars
 Vorau Priory at Vorau (Styria): Augustinian Canons

 W 

Waldhausen Priory (dissolved) at Waldhausen im Strudengau (Upper Austria): Augustinian Canons
Wernberg Convent in Schloss Wernberg, Wernberg (Carinthia): Mission Sisters of the Precious Blood
Wettingen-Mehrerau Abbey at Bregenz (Vorarlberg): Cistercian monks; formerly Benedictine monks
Wilhering Abbey at Wilhering (Upper Austria): Cistercian monks
Wilten Abbey at Wilten in Innsbruck (Tyrol): Premonstratensian canons
Windhaag Convent, Windhaag bei Perg (Upper Austria): Dominican nuns

 Z 
Zwettl Abbey at Zwettl (Lower Austria): Cistercian monks

 Formerly in Austria 

 South Tyrol, Italy 

This area became part of Italy after the end of World War I.

Franciscan Friary, Bolzano, in Bolzano (Bozen): Franciscans
Brixen:
St. Elizabeth's Priory, Brixen: Poor Clares
Brixen Friary: Franciscan friars
Innichen:
Innichen Abbey: Benedictine monks to 1141; thereafter men's collegiate foundation (Herrenstift)
Innichen Friary: Franciscan friars
Kaltern Friary in Kaltern: Franciscans
Marienberg Abbey at Burgeis: Benedictine monks
Muri-Gries Abbey at Gries-Quirein, Bolzano: Benedictine monks; formerly Augustinian Canons, then a men's collegiate foundation (Herrenstift'')
Neustift Priory or Abbey at Neustift bei Brixen, Vahrn: Augustinian Canons
Säben Abbey at Klausen: Benedictine nuns

Notes

References

 
Monasteries
Austria